Hermann Bauer (born 23 May 1966) is an Austrian rower. He competed at the 1988 Summer Olympics, 1992 Summer Olympics and the 1996 Summer Olympics.

References

1966 births
Living people
Austrian male rowers
Olympic rowers of Austria
Rowers at the 1988 Summer Olympics
Rowers at the 1992 Summer Olympics
Rowers at the 1996 Summer Olympics
Rowers from Linz